Boechera oxylobula, common name Glenwood Springs rockcress, is a plant species referred to as Arabis demissa in many older publications. The species is endemic to Colorado. It is known only from Garfield, Gunnison, Hinsdale, Lake, Mineral, Park, and Saguache counties in the central part of the state. It is found in open, rocky locations such as cliff faces, rocky slopes, and gravelly soil in brush.

Boechera oxylobula is a perennial herb with several stems arising from a basal rosette. Leaves are linear, up to 2.5 mm (0.1 inches) wide. Flowers are white to pale lavender, borne in a terminal raceme.

References

oxylobula
Flora of Colorado